Otávio Dutra (born 22 November 1983 in Fortaleza) is a professional footballer who plays as a centre-back for Liga 1 club Madura United, on loan from Persija Jakarta. Born in Brazil, he represented Indonesia at international level.

Club career

Persipura Jayapura
In October 2012, Dutra officially joined Persipura Jayapura. At Persipura, he became a formidable defender with Bio Paulin. Not only as a central defender, he also became the most fertile defender to score goals in the 2013 Indonesia Super League. Until it succeeded in bringing Persipura to become Champions.

Persegres Gresik United
In December 2013, Dutra signed a one-year contract with Persegres Gresik United at a cost of Rp 2 billion. He made his debut on 3 February 2014 in a match against Persik Kediri. On 25 February 2014, Dutra scored his first goal for Gresik United against Barito Putera in the 28th minute at the Petrokimia Stadium, Gresik.

Bhayangkara
In 2015, Dutra joined Bhayangkara in the 2016 Indonesia Soccer Championship A and made his debut against Barito Putera in the first week. In his debut match, Dutra made his first goal from the penalty kick in a draw 1–1.

In the sixth week, he scored one goal against Persib Bandung. The goal was scored in the 64th minute in a home win 4–1.

Persebaya Surabaya
On January 6, 2018, He signed a year contract with Persebaya Surabaya for 2018 Liga 1. He made his debut in a 1–0 home win against Badak Lampung on 25 March 2018.

On December 17, 2018, he renewed contract with Persebaya Surabaya On May 11, 2019, Dutra suffered an injury during Persebaya friendly match against Persela Lamongan before the 2019 Liga 1 starts on May 11, 2019. Dutra only played for 37 minutes due to a broken nose after colliding with a Persela's player. As a result, Dutra only rested less than two months. He also had to wear face shields. Dutra returned from a broken nose bone injury that struck him. He made his debut in a 3–2 home win against Persela Lamongan at the Gelora Bung Tomo Stadium on 1 July 2019. he appeared wearing a face mask in the sixth week of the match. He told that he still had problems having to wear a mask throughout the match.

Persija Jakarta
On January 1, 2020, He signed two years contract with Indonesian Liga 1 side Persija Jakarta. This season was suspended on 27 March 2020 due to the COVID-19 pandemic. The season was abandoned and was declared void on 20 January 2021.

Madura United
On 29 January 2023, Dutra signed a contract with Liga 1 club Madura United from Persija Jakarta. Dutra made his league debut for the club in a 2–3 lose against Persis Solo.

International career
Born in Brazil, he renounced Brazilian citizenship, and become an Indonesian citizen (WNI). He has taken an oath or pledge of allegiance to the Unitary State of the Republic of Indonesia (NKRI) as a condition of naturalization. He made his debut for the Indonesia in the 2022 FIFA World Cup qualification against Vietnam on 15 October 2019.

Career statistics

Club

International appearances

Honours

Club
Persebaya Surabaya
 Liga Primer Indonesia: 2011
 Unity Cup: 2011
 Indonesia Premier League runner-up: 2011–12
 Indonesia President's Cup runner-up: 2019
 Liga 1 runner-up: 2019

Persipura Jayapura
 Indonesian Super League: 2013

Bhayangkara
 Liga 1: 2017

Persija Jakarta
Menpora Cup: 2021

References

External links 
 
 

1984 births
Living people
Sportspeople from Fortaleza
Indonesian footballers
Indonesia international footballers
Brazilian footballers
Brazilian emigrants to Indonesia
Indonesian people of Brazilian descent
Brazilian expatriate footballers
Brazilian expatriate sportspeople in Poland
Brazilian expatriate sportspeople in Indonesia
Expatriate footballers in Poland
Expatriate footballers in Indonesia
Ekstraklasa players
Indonesian Premier League players
Liga 1 (Indonesia) players
Macaé Esporte Futebol Clube players
Pogoń Szczecin players
Persipura Jayapura players
Bhayangkara F.C. players
Persegres Gresik players 
Gresik United players
Persebaya Surabaya players
Persija Jakarta players
Association football central defenders
Indonesian Super League-winning players
Naturalised citizens of Indonesia